The Mero site is a stratified, multicomponent prehistoric site located on the south side of Marshall's Point on the Door Peninsula in Door County, Wisconsin. It was excavated in 1960 by Ronald and Carol Mason under the auspices of the Neville Public Museum in Green Bay, Wisconsin, with financial backing from the landowner, Peter Mero.

As of 2016, Marshall's Point is a gated residential community. The privately owned interior of the community is recognized as a Wisconsin State Natural Area.

Results of data analysis 
Excavations at the site yielded Prehistoric artifacts and animal bone.

Three stratified areas were identified at the site:

 Stratified Area I – cultural deposits from this area dated from the Middle Woodland period and are designated North Bay I Complex.  Artifacts and animal bone were recovered from a buried beach area, and another stratigraphic layer underneath the beach.  Late Woodland and Upper Mississippian cultural remains came from the top levels.
 Stratified Areas II and III – cultural deposits from the lower strata of  these areas are designated North Bay II Complex, and the top levels correspond to Late Woodland and Upper Mississippian.  Stratigraphic layers were consistent between these two areas but could not be matched with the layers in Stratified Area I.

Additional material from all time periods was also plentiful in the unstratified portions of the site.

Components 
Several Prehistoric components were present at the site:

 Middle Woodland – dates to approximately 200 B.C. to A.D. 500 and is characterized by the North Bay I and North Bay II Complexes. The diagnostic artifact is the grit-tempered pottery that is described as very heavily tempered and poorly constructed with rough surface in North Bay I and somewhat smoother and more moderately tempered in North Bay II. Both North Bay I and II have close affinities to the Middle Woodland Hopewell culture.
 Late Woodland – dates to approximately A.D. 500-1000 and is characterized mainly by Heins Creek Ware pottery, named after the nearby Heins Creek Site also in Door County, Wisconsin, along with other regional Late Woodland pottery types such as Point Sauble Collared and Madison Cord-Impressed. It is thought that the Heins Creek Ware evolved out of the Middle Woodland North Bay Complex. The Madison Cord-Impressed is affiliated with the Late Woodland Effigy Mound culture.  A radiocarbon date of A.D. 720 was obtained from the Late Woodland deposits at the Heins Creek site and based upon the similarity of pottery between the two sites, that probably dates the Late Woodland component at Mero as well.
 Upper Mississippian – dates from approximately A.D. 1200-1400 (based upon stratigraphic position and the traits observed on the artifacts) and is the largest component at the site. The characteristic artifact is Oneota pottery.  Unlike other Oneota components in the American Midwest, much of the pottery is grit-tempered (about 40%) than shell-tempered, rarely has handles, and is rarely decorated.  The stratified sequence demonstrates that the incidence of grit temper decreases over time and is replaced by shell temper in the upper strata. Other typical Oneota traits such as arrowshaft straighteners, sherd discs, smoking pipes, storage pits and evidence of agriculture, are not present at Mero. The component was designated “Mero Complex” (aka Green Bay Phase) by Mason, and is considered to have close affinities to the Grand River focus.

Animal remains 
Remains from several species were recovered from the site. The main species present were deer, beaver, porcupine, dog, bear, otter, fish (esp. sturgeon, channel catfish, and smallmouth bass), marten, common loon, fisher and mink. These remains were not modified into tools like the bone tools described in the Artifacts section below, and may be considered food remains or, in the case of the dog and bear, possibly the remains of ceremonial activities. Dog sacrifice and dog meat consumption was observed to have ceremonial and religious implications in early Native American tribes. Bear worship and ceremonialism has also been recorded in the ethnological record.

Artifacts

Pottery artifacts 
Archaeologists often find pottery to be a very useful tool in analyzing a prehistoric culture. It is usually very plentiful at a site and the details of manufacture and decoration are very sensitive indicators of time, space and culture.

No whole or reconstructable vessels were recovered from the site, so the analysis was based upon examination of rim and body sherds. Due to the large number of very small sherds, an effort was made to convert a raw sherd count into an estimated minimum number of vessels present. This provided a more accurate estimate of the relative proportions of pottery types represented.

11,835 sherds overall were recovered, representing a minimum of 501 vessels. Within the North Bay I and II Complexes, there were 951 sherds representing 59 vessels.  For the Late Woodland, there were 2,256 sherds representing 111 vessels. The Upper Mississippian component had 8,628 sherds (of which only 146 were decorated) representing 331 vessels (205 shell-tempered and 126 grit-tempered).

Several pottery types from different time periods were present. Some of them are listed below:

Other artifacts 
Non-pottery artifacts recovered from the site included:

 Chipped stone artifacts – including 118 projectile points, scrapers (subdivided into variants based on manufacturing technique), 82 blanks, 4 knives, 8 drills, one spokeshave and one hand axe.  Of the projectile points, 78 were triangular points and 40 were stemmed and notched.
 Ground stone artifacts – including 4 hammerstones, 12 net sinkers and 3 celts.
 Bone and antler artifacts – including 20 split bone awls, 5 deer ulna awls, 4 drifts, 1 decorated/grooved awl, 1 socketed antler projectile point, 1 socketed deer metapodial projectile point, 5 mat needles, 5 counters, 11 hair pins and 2 tooth pendants (one dog and one bear).
 Copper artifacts – including 1 awl and 1 tanged spatulate knife.

Significance 
The cultural sequence at the Mero site reveals a long series of occupations from 500 B.C. to A.D. 1400, or almost 2,000 years. The pottery record indicates an in situ evolution from the Middle Woodland North Bay culture to the Late Woodland Heins Creek culture; but after A.D. 1000 there is an intrusive Upper Mississippian presence characterized by Oneota pottery.

The Oneota Mero Complex (aka Green Bay focus) is unique due to its high proportion of grit-tempered pottery and the low incidence of decoration. It is also unique that the site does not have many of the traits usually found in Oneota contexts such as arrowshaft straighteners, smoking pipes, sherd discs, storage pits or evidence of agriculture. The reason may be that the site was not a village but rather a temporary site for a specialized activity such as fishing.

References

Further reading 

Archaeological sites in Wisconsin
Mississippian culture
Door County, Wisconsin